Catherine Tyldesley (born 17 September 1983) is an English actress, comedian and model known for her roles as Iris Moss in the BBC drama Lilies, Eva Price on the ITV soap opera Coronation Street from 2011 to 2018 and Karen Norris in BBC One sitcom Scarborough in 2019.

In 2019, Tyldesley participated in the seventeenth series of Strictly Come Dancing and was partnered with Johannes Radebe.

Early life and career
Tyldesley is from Walkden, Greater Manchester. She attended St. George's RC High School and Pendleton College before training at the Birmingham School of Acting (formerly the Birmingham School of Speech & Drama), graduating in 2005.

Tyldesley's television credits include Coronation Street, Holby City, Two Pints of Lager and a Packet of Crisps, Sorted, Florence Nightingale Red Riding, Shameless and Trollied. She played the lead role of Iris Moss in the Liverpool-set BBC drama Lilies. She also appeared in the comedy television pilot Guantanamo Phil, part of the Channel 4 Comedy Showcase 2009.

In 2010, Tyldesley played the role of Abi Peterson in Emmerdale for two months. Tyldesley sings in the range of mezzo-soprano. She has also modelled for the House of Fraser.

In 2016, she released her debut studio album, Rise.

Coronation Street

Tyldesley played a midwife in an episode broadcast on 13 January 2006. In May 2011, Tyldesley was cast in the regular role of Eva. The actress began filming her first scenes that month. During an interview with Digital Spy, Tyldesley revealed that there had been a lot of competition for the role of Eva and that she felt "incredibly lucky" to have secured the part. Tyldesley said she felt "nervous" when she first arrived on set. Speaking to What's on TV, she said that she had a "mini freak out" when filming her first scenes in The Rovers. Tyldesley added that Coronation Street is "absolutely legendary" and is thrilled to be a part of the cast. After impressing producers, it was later confirmed that Tyldesley was to be kept on as a permanent member of the cast. After signing a new six-month contract, an executive said that Eva will be involved in some "cracking" storylines towards the end of the year. In May 2012, Tyldesley expressed her desire for a long-term stint on the show. Speaking to the Daily Mirror, Tyldesley said "I've always wanted to be in Corrie. So when I got the phone call to tell me that I'd got the part, I was thrilled to bits." She also added that Eva has got "so much scope".

Before she appeared on screen, Eva was described as being "feisty". Tyldesley revealed more about her character, saying "Eva is a little bit of a princess! She's been spoiled rotten, so she's somewhat high maintenance and a little bit of a drama queen. She's definitely used to getting her own way." The actress said her character adores her mother and they share a great relationship. When Eva enters the show, her circumstances force her to be more angry than she normally is. Tyldesley said that Eva does have a softer side, which she believed viewers would see in the future. When asked why Eva and Karl do not get along, Tyldesley said "I think it's because they're both quite similar. When Eva first joins the street, she's had a little bit of turmoil with past relationships and things like that, so I think she feels like she wants to be quite selfish at the moment, which annoys Karl. But she's always been full of self-importance because she's always been spoiled – she's not known any different." Tyldesley revealed that Eva is not a lesbian character, despite a newspaper report, and that she definitely loves the boys. When asked about Eva's type, Tyldesley said that they would have to be "on her wavelength" as Eva gets bored and frustrated with people who are not on her level. In May 2012, Tyldesley commented that Eva's glamorous lifestyle can be "straining" and she enjoys time off work so she can wear normal and more comfortable clothes.

In December 2017, it was announced that Tyldesley had decided to leave the series; her final scenes aired on 3 August 2018.

Personal life
Tyldesley's second cousin is former England cricket captain Michael Vaughan.

In August 2014, Tyldesley announced she and her partner Tom Pitfield were expecting their first child. On 30 August 2014, Tyldesley announced via Twitter that she was engaged to Pitfield. She gave birth to son Alfie James on 18 March 2015. On 21 May 2016, Tyldesley married Pitfield. In October 2021, Tyldesley announced she and Pitfield were expecting their second child. She gave birth to her daughter, Iris Ella, on 19 April 2022.

Filmography

Television

Guest appearances
Loose Women (2011) – Guest
I'm a Celebrity, Get Me Out of Here! NOW! (2011) – Guest panellist
Life on Murs (2012) – Herself
Lorraine (2012) – Guest
Through the Keyhole (21 September 2013 & 17 February 2018) – Guest panellist
All Star Family Fortunes (17 February 2013 & 28 December 2013) – Contestant
Tonight (2015-2017) - Herself 
Loose Women (2018) — Guest Panellist
Tipping Point: Lucky Stars (2018) - Herself-Contestant
Strictly Come Dancing (2019) - Herself-Contestant; series 17
Who Wants to Be a Millionaire? (2019) - Herself-Contestant
The Weakest Link (2021) - Herself-Contestant; Strictly Come Dancing Special.
Moneybags (2022) –  Herself-Contestant; Moneybags Celebrity Special

Discography

Studio album

Awards and nominations

References

External links

Official Website

1983 births
Living people
Alumni of Birmingham School of Acting
English soap opera actresses
English television actresses
Actresses from Salford
People from Walkden